Marita Aronson (born 10 May 1939 in Guddarp, Småland) is a Swedish Liberal People's Party politician. She was a member of the Riksdag from 2002 to 2006.

External links
Marita Aronson at the Riksdag website

1939 births
Living people
People from Ljungby Municipality
Members of the Riksdag from the Liberals (Sweden)
Women members of the Riksdag
Members of the Riksdag 2002–2006
21st-century Swedish women politicians